The Brightest Void is the third EP by Finnish rock and metal soprano vocalist Tarja Turunen. It serves as a prequel to the main album The Shadow Self. It was released on the 3 June 2016 and contains 9 tracks.

Background
This album came to Tarja as an idea for a big surprise and gift to her fans containing material recorded but not being included on the main album. She explained: "During the long process of recording the songs for my new studio album ‘The Shadow Self’, I realised that there were so many tracks... ...for just one album. So this time I decided to keep nothing for myself and to share all my favourite new songs with you, the fans, who have shown such passionate and constant support."

On 14 April 2016, earMUSIC released a trailer for the video, "No Bitter End".  The whole video was released on 20 April.

On 27 May 2016, Tarja announced the full-length album was available for streaming on Apple Music.

Track listing

Personnel

Musicians

 Tarja Turunen - vocals
 Julian Barrett 
 Peter Barrett 
 Kevin Chown 
 Luis Conte
 Mike Coolen - drums
 Guillermo De Medio 
 Sharon den Adel - vocals on track 9
 Jim Dooley 
 Stefan Helleblad - guitars on track 9
 Bart Hendrickson 
 Ruud Jolie - guitars on track 9
 Izumi Kawakatsu 
 Christian Kretschmar 
 Max Lilja - cello
 Michael Monroe - vocals on track 2
 Mervi Myllyoja - violin
 Atli Örvarsson
 Tim Palmer - Mixing
 Nico Polo 
 Fernando Scarcella 
 Alex Scholpp - guitar
 Chad Smith - drums on track 3
 Martijn Spierenburg - keyboards on track 9
 Torsten Stenzel 
 Mike Terrana - drums
 Toni Turunen  - vocals on track 3
 Jeroen van Veen - bass guitar on track 9
 Mel Wesson 
 Robert Westerholt - guitars on track 9
 Doug Wimbish 
 Anders Wollbeck

Charts

References

External links
 Tarja-theshadowself.com
 Tarjaturunen.com

Tarja Turunen albums
2016 albums